The Devil's Disciple is a 1959 British-American film adaptation of the 1897 George Bernard Shaw play The Devil's Disciple.  The Anglo-American film was directed by Guy Hamilton, who replaced Alexander Mackendrick, and starred Burt Lancaster, Kirk Douglas and Laurence Olivier. Mary Grant designed the film's costumes.

Lancaster and Douglas made several films together over the decades, including I Walk Alone (1948), Gunfight at the O.K. Corral (1957), Seven Days in May (1964) and Tough Guys (1986).

Plot

Richard "Dick" Dudgeon (Kirk Douglas) is apostate and outcast from his family in colonial Websterbridge, New Hampshire, who returns their hatred with scorn. After the death of his father, who was mistakenly hanged by the British as a rebel in nearby Springtown, Dick rescues his body from the gallows, where it had been left as an example to others, and has it buried in the parish graveyard in Websterbridge. He then returns to his childhood home to hear the reading of his father's will, much to his family's dismay.

Local minister Rev. Anthony Anderson (Burt Lancaster), who was almost arrested for trying to talk the British into taking the body down, treats him with courtesy, despite Dick's self-proclaimed apostasy, but Dick's "wickedness" appalls Anderson's wife Judith (Janette Scott).  To everyone's surprise, it is revealed that Dick's father secretly changed his will just before he died, leaving the bulk of his estate to Dick. Much to his shock, Dick's mother (Eva Le Gallienne) refuses to stay with him (a change from the stage play, wherein he promptly evicts his mother from her home). Dick proclaims himself a rebel against the British and scorns his family as cowards when they flee his home. In the meantime, the British discover the father's grave.

While Dick is visiting the Andersons' home at the Reverend's invitation to take tea, Rev. Anderson is called out to Mrs. Dudgeon's deathbed. With Anderson's permission, Dick is left alone with Judith. She has been instructed to keep him at the house for his safety, and to serve tea while Anderson is gone. Perceiving Judith's distaste for him, Dick attempts to leave, but Judith insists he stay until Anderson returns, lest her husband think she has disobeyed him.

While waiting, British soldiers enter Anderson's home and arrest Dick, mistaking him for Anderson, whom they believe illegally retrieved the body. Dick allows them to take him away without revealing his actual identity. He swears Judith to secrecy lest her husband give the secret away and expose himself to arrest. Judith, in a state of great agitation, finds her husband, who asks if Dick has harmed her. Breaking her promise to Dick, Judith reveals that soldiers came to arrest Anderson but Dick went in his place, stunning Anderson, who tells Judith to have Dudgeon keep quiet as long as possible, to give him "more start", then quickly drives away. Judith believes her husband to be a coward (not knowing he has gone to seek help from Lawyer Hawkins (Basil Sydney), secretly the leader of the local rebels) while Dick, whom she despised, she now sees as a hero.

Judith visits Dick and asks him if he has acted from love for her. He tells her that he has acted according to "the law of my own nature", which forbade him to save himself by condemning another. At a military trial, Dick is convicted and sentenced to be hanged, not for his theft of the body, but for his open acknowledgment that he is a rebel.

In this scene, we become better acquainted with General Burgoyne (Laurence Olivier), a charming gentleman and Shavian realist, who contributes a number of sharp remarks about the conduct of the American Revolution and the British Army, and engages in some gentlemanly verbal repartée with Dick who seems surprisingly unaffected by the high probability of being hanged. Burgoyne does believe he is Anderson, but notes his rather un-clerical behavior. After Dick is condemned, Judith interrupts the proceedings to reveal Dick's true identity, but to no avail, as he will be hanged in any case due to remarks he made during the trial, which the British consider treasonous regardless of his identity.

Meanwhile, Anderson suddenly decides to abandon his ministry and turn rebel. In Springtown, a battle is going on. Anderson finds a house that the British have commandeered that is next to their ammunition dump. Anderson sneaks into the house, fends off several British redcoats, sets his coat on fire on log, and throwing it out the window explodes the British ammunition dump. Surviving relatively unscathed, he then dons the clothes of a Loyalist courier bringing an urgent message from General Howe and reaches the village where Dick is about to be hanged.

Like Sydney Carton in Dickens's A Tale of Two Cities, Dick defies his executioners and prepares to meet his death. However, Anderson confronts Burgoyne, informing him that the rebels have re-taken Springtown, have a British general as a prisoner, and that a captured message reveals that a relief army supposed to be in Albany is really farther away in New York City, being misinformed about his location; Burgoyne is outnumbered.

Anthony Anderson has become a man of action in an instant, just as Dick became a man of conscience in an instant. In Springtown, the British called for a truce, and Anderson bargains on the terms of the truce, including Dick's life; Burgoyne agrees to free him. Anderson tells Dick and Judith that he (Anderson) is no longer a minister but a Captain of militia, and will not stand in their way. Judith seems to be as entranced with Dick as she was previously disgusted with him. When Dick says they can go away together, she runs off; Anderson follows, sweeping Judith onto his horse and they leave Websterbridge. Under the temporary truce, Burgoyne invites Dick to tea.

Cast
 Burt Lancaster – Reverend Anthony Anderson
 Kirk Douglas – Richard "Dick" Dudgeon
 Laurence Olivier – General John Burgoyne
 Janette Scott – Judith Anderson
 Eva Le Gallienne – Mrs. Dudgeon
 Harry Andrews – Major Swindon
 Basil Sydney – Lawyer Hawkins
 George Rose – British sergeant
 Neil McCallum – Christopher (Christie) Dudgeon
 Mervyn Johns – Reverend Maindeck Parshotter
 David Horne – Uncle William
 Erik Chitty – Uncle Titus
 Allan Cuthbertson – British captain
 Percy Herbert – British lieutenant
 Phyllis Morris – Wife of Titus
 Brian Oulton – Chaplain Brudenell
 Jenny Jones – Essie
 Sheree Winton – Platinum Blond
 Steven Berkoff – British Corporal

Production and reception
The play was among those by George Bernard Shaw whose film rights were purchased by Gabriel Pascal in 1938; a planned production was announced several times in the years that followed. The rights were acquired from Pascal's estate by the production company of Burt Lancaster and Harold Hecht in 1955. The film was shot at Associated British Studios in Elstree, near London, England between late July and mid-October 1958. In early August, the production company announced original director Alexander Mackendrick had been replaced by Guy Hamilton.

A.H. Weiler in The New York Times argued admirers of Shaw's "plays would be a mite confused by this copiously edited and re-written edition of his noted lampoon of American Revolutionary events and some Englishmen involved in losing a valuable colony." This adaptation "is, somewhat disappointingly, less the biting satire of the stage and more an unevenly paced comedy-melodrama leaning heavily toward action. ... Shaw's meticulous development of character and a healthy portion of his gibes and barbs are merely shadowy effects here".

See also
 List of American films of 1959
 List of films about the American Revolution
 List of television series and miniseries about the American Revolution

References

External links
 

 
 

1950s historical comedy films
1950s satirical films
1959 films
American black-and-white films
American historical comedy films
American films based on plays
American Revolutionary War films
American satirical films
British films based on plays
British historical comedy films
British satirical films
Bryna Productions films
Films based on works by George Bernard Shaw
Films directed by Guy Hamilton
Films produced by Burt Lancaster
Films produced by James Hill
Films produced by Harold Hecht
Films scored by Richard Rodney Bennett
Films set in the 1770s
Films set in New Hampshire
Films shot at Associated British Studios
Norma Productions films
United Artists films
1950s English-language films
1950s American films
1950s British films